Georgetown is an unincorporated community located within Mansfield Township, Burlington County, New Jersey, United States. It was named for George Sykes, who served in the U.S. Congress.

Transportation
County Route 537, County Route 545, and  NJ Route 68 are major roads around Georgetown. The New Jersey Turnpike passes Georgetown to the northwest. The closest exit to Georgetown on the NJ Turnpike is exit 7 (U.S. 206 – Bordentown, Trenton).

References

Mansfield Township, Burlington County, New Jersey
Unincorporated communities in Burlington County, New Jersey
Unincorporated communities in New Jersey